Gebhardshain is a former Verbandsgemeinde ("collective municipality") in the district of Altenkirchen, in Rhineland-Palatinate, Germany. On 1 January 2017 it merged into the new Verbandsgemeinde Betzdorf-Gebhardshain. The seat of the Verbandsgemeinde was in Gebhardshain.

The Verbandsgemeinde Gebhardshain consisted of the following Ortsgemeinden ("local municipalities"):

 Dickendorf
 Elben
 Elkenroth
 Fensdorf
 Gebhardshain
 Kausen
 Malberg
 Molzhain
 Nauroth
 Rosenheim
 Steinebach/Sieg
 Steineroth

Former Verbandsgemeinden in Rhineland-Palatinate